Acromycter nezumi is an eel in the family Congridae (conger/garden eels). It was described by Hirotoshi Asano in 1958, originally under the genus Promyllantor. It is a marine, temperate water-dwelling eel which is known from Japan, in the northwestern Pacific Ocean. Males can reach a maximum total length of 40 centimetres.

References

Congridae
Fish described in 1958
Taxa named by Hirotoshi Asano